Thies Ole Prinz (born 7 July 1998) is a German field hockey player.

Personal life
Thies Prinz was born and raised in Berlin, Germany.

Career

Club level
In club competition, Prinz plays for Rot Weiss-Köln in the German Bundesliga.

Junior national team
Thies Prinz made his debut for the German U–21 team in 2016. His first appearance was during a four-nations series in Valencia. Later that year he went on to represent the team at the FIH Junior World Cup in Lucknow, winning a bronze medal.

In 2017, he won a second bronze medal with the junior team at the EuroHockey Junior Championship in Valencia.

His final year with the team was 2019. He made multiple appearances throughout the year, competing in numerous test matches and at an eight-nations tournament in Madrid. He finished his junior career on a high, winning gold at the EuroHockey Junior Championship in Valencia.

Die Honamas
Prinz made his debut for Die Honamas in 2017, during a three-nations tournament in Moers.

He competed in the first season of the FIH Pro League.

Following the retirements of senior players following the 2020 Summer Olympics, Prinz was officially added to the national squad.

References

External links
 
 

1998 births
Living people
German male field hockey players
Male field hockey forwards
Men's Feldhockey Bundesliga players
Sportspeople from Berlin
2023 Men's FIH Hockey World Cup players
21st-century German people